The 2008 NBA Development League expansion draft was the third expansion draft of the National Basketball Association Development League (NBADL). The draft was held on September 24, 2008, so that the newly founded Reno Bighorns and Erie BayHawks could acquire players for the upcoming 2008–09 season.

A random drawing determined who was awarded the first pick, which went to the Reno Bighorns. The teams switched their draft order each succeeding round. The available players to draft came from a list of 55 unprotected players who had competed in the NBADL in 2007–08.

The first overall draft pick in the expansion draft was Damone Brown, a  guard who had played for the Sioux Falls Skyforce the season before. Brown had played collegiately at Syracuse and then spent three years playing professional basketball before his 2008 NBADL Expansion Draft selection. He was also one of three players to have also been chosen in an NBA Draft (2001); the others include Randy Livingston (1996) and Dahntay Jones (2003). Two players, Livingston and Brian Chase, had previously been selected as NBA Development League All-Stars. Chase was a 2007 All-Star, while Livingston earned the honor in 2008. The only non-American player chosen was Mustafa Al-Sayyad, who was born in Khartoum, Sudan and played college basketball at Fresno State.

Key

Draft

References
General

Specific

draft
NBA G League expansion draft
Erie BayHawks (2008–2017)
Stockton Kings
Nba Development League Expansion Draft
September 2008 sports events in the United States
2008 in New York City